William Baltzell Ebbert (February 28, 1846 – February 27, 1927) was an officer and adjutant in the Union Army (1st Regiment West Virginia Infantry Volunteers), a Colorado legislator, newspaper publisher, author, farmer, businessman, and poet. Ebbert published the Pueblo Review and Standard newspaper in 1890, authored the landmark meat inspection legislation in Colorado in 1889 and battled with Prohibitionists in the 1910s.  As a Director of the Montezuma Valley Irrigation District from 1911 to 1920, he guided the district through turbulent times and helped engineer its dissolution and reemergence as the Montezuma Valley Irrigation Company in 1920.

A newspaper article in 1911 touted him as a candidate for the U.S. Senate, and perhaps best describes the respect he commanded: "His record for good works for Colorado is not excelled by any living man and he would command the respect and wield an influence in the highest legislative body in the land that would be beneficial to not only his state but to the nation at large."

Ebbert was the patriarch of a farming family in the Cortez, Rocky Ford and Pueblo areas of Colorado.  Ebbert's father, John Van Kirk Ebbert, was the cousin of Congressman George Ebbert Seney (Ohio Democrat, served 1883–1891).

In addition to writing for various newspapers and magazines, William B. Ebbert also authored a compilation of his writings and poetry, "On Colorado's Fair Mesas" in 1897.

Ebbert represented the counties of Pueblo, Otero, and Montezuma in the Colorado General Assembly in the late 19th and early 20th centuries. Ebbert was born in Wheeling, West Virginia. He was the only son of Charlotte Baltzell and John Van Kirk Ebbert, of Fayette County, Pennsylvania. After several years in the Union Army, he moved briefly to Covington, Kentucky and the Cincinnati, Ohio area.  On Christmas Day, 1866, at age 20, he married Cornelia Blanche Hall in Wheeling. After Cornelia's death in 1881, William B. Ebbert and his three children (Blanche, Edith, and William) moved to the Pueblo, Colorado area and took up farming.  He soon met and married Catherine Scheutle in 1884 in Pueblo.  William and Catherine produced three more boys in Colorado; all died at prematurely. In Colorado, Ebbert established himself as a community leader, author, and politician. He served several years in the Colorado Legislature, representing Dolores, Otero, Pueblo, and Montezuma counties. Legendary railroad chieftain Otto Mears bestowed upon Ebbert one of his rare silver railroad passes in 1889 (Silverton Railroad Pass No. 193).  After a respected life in the military, agriculture, and politics, William B. Ebbert died on February 27, 1927, in Cortez, Colorado. It was just one day before his 81st birthday.  He is buried at the Lewis Cemetery, a few miles north of Cortez, Colorado.

Military service in the Union Army

1861–1865: 1st Regiment, West Virginia Infantry Volunteers
Only 15 years old when he enlisted in 1861, William B. Ebbert rose from Private to Sergeant Major by 1864.  Soon after, West Virginia Governor Arthur Boreman commissioned William B. Ebbert as a First Lieutenant at the age of 18. Colonel Weddle then appointed Ebbert as Acting Adjutant.

Ebbert fought in many famous American Civil War battles, including battles in the Shenandoah Valley (Winchester, Port Republic, and Second Bull Run).  He had lied about his age so he could enlist in the Union Army in 1861 at the age of 15.  Ebbert served in the 1st West Virginia Infantry Volunteers, Company A and later in Company H. (His father, John Van Kirk Ebbert, enlisted in 1861 at age 46, and served as a Sergeant in Company I, 1st West Virginia Infantry Volunteers, and later as Corporal, Independent Pennsylvania Battery H, Light Artillery.)

Ebbert often faced troops led by Stonewall Jackson, and engaged in battles in the Shenandoah Valley, Virginia, under General Shield, General Sheridan, and others.

His first engagement was near Winchester on March 25, 1862. He wrote:

we drove back Jackson. We were under the hottest fire at Port Republic afterwards, where we lost nearly half my company -were defeated, routed, and pursued for 14 miles by Confederate cavalry, which never ceased firing on us during our retreat.
 
He wrote further:

Men who served in the Union Army Regiment with Ebbert
Ebbert served under General Shield, General Sheridan, and others.
Colonel Thoburn (Thoburn was killed the day of Sheridan's ride. Ebbert described him as "ambitious and reckless of his life.")
Colonel Weddle (Ebbert notes that "Weddle was steady and brave, not pushing his men needlessly into danger."
Sergeant John Van Kirk Ebbert, his father.

Service in the Colorado Legislature: "a farmer in politics"
Ebbert served in the Colorado General Assembly from 1889 to 1890 as a Republican, and 1907–1908 and 1911–1912 as a Democrat. He represented Pueblo, Dolores, Otero, and Montezuma counties in the lower house.

He was chairman of the powerful Assembly Rules Committee and served on various other committees. Ebbert ran for Speaker of the Assembly in 1911.

Committee and leadership positions
Chairman, Rules Committee (1889)
Chairman, Education, Finance Ways and Means Committee (1889)
Revision and Constitution Committee
State Institutions Committee
Chairman, Federal Relations Committee (1911, 1912)
Indian and Military Affairs
Insurance Committee
Mercantile and Manufacturing Interests
Public Lands Committee
Stock Committee
Towns and Cities

Agricultural leader
Upon arriving in Colorado in 1881, Ebbert quickly built up his farming business. He held numerous offices in the agricultural and business communities:

President, Valley Beet Growers Association
President, Capital Hill Melon Grower's Association (Newdale, Colorado) 
President, Rocky Ford Creamery Company
Presided over Farmers' Institutes
City Board of Trade
Director, Montezuma Valley Irrigation District

His legislation in 1889 required inspection of meats 24 hours before slaughter, helping protect consumers from spoiled foreign meat products and assisting Colorado's cattle industry.  As a successful sugar beet farmer, Ebbert battled against big sugar companies for farmers' rights.

Ebbert's treatise on dirty politics: "Titles are Trash"
Although Ebbert is most notable for his dealings with agricultural issues, he also tussled with Prohibitionists of the time, culminating in his impassioned writings on the shamefulness of dirty politics and political mudslinging.

Ebbert publicly supported local control over the legality of liquor (i.e., the "Local Option"). Prohibitionists and some clergy sought to unseat him. During the 1910 Assembly elections, the Anti-Saloon League of Denver and various religious leaders targeted Ebbert for defeat. It is in this battle that Ebbert delivered one of his finest political statements to date. After narrowly winning reelection despite an eleventh hour "hit piece" mailer sent by activist preacher Rev. E.E. McLaughlin, Ebbert retorted:

Ebbert as poet
Ebbert was known as a great orator and poet and possessed a striking command of the English language. He published his writings in the 1897 book, On Colorado's Fair Mesas. The following poem is published in the book:

Family life: untimely death of children
Ebbert reared nine children over a 22-year period. Six of the nine children died prematurely.

In Cincinnati: 
Louis died of pneumonia at age 9 months; 
Cornelia died of cholera at 1 year; and 
an unnamed baby boy died at age 23 days.

In Colorado:
Wilson died of "stomach problems" at age 36;
Irving died of diabetes at age 19; and 
Wolcott died of leukemia at age 19.

Only one son survived: William Dickinson Ebbert (1876–1951), and two daughters, Blanche (1868–1952) and Edith (1872–1946).

Ebbert's first wife Cornelia died on July 5, 1881, in Cincinnati, Ohio a few weeks after the birth of their sixth child. The baby and mother are interred at Oak Grove Cemetery in Cincinnati.

By 1881, two of William and Cornelia's children had died as infants. While giving birth to their sixth child, Cornelia died. The baby died a few weeks later, making it the third child to die.  After Cornelia's death in 1881, Ebbert moved to Colorado and married Catherine Scheutle on July 1, 1884, near Pueblo.

The Ebbert Ranch was located outside Cortez, Colorado, near Arriola.

The Ebbert clan had lived in several locations in Colorado over the years: first in Pueblo, then Rocky Ford, and later settling in Montezuma County. The Ebbert Ranch was located off U.S. Route 491 (formerly Hwy 666), 9.58 miles north of Cortez, just south of a large irrigation flume that crosses over the freeway. (It is located on the east half of the SW one quarter and lots 3 and 4 of Section 7, Twp. 37, North of Range 16, west of the New Mexico Prime Meridian.) The Ebbert ranch house was built in 1908 and is still standing.

Memorable quotations
"Titles are trash.  A league is good if its good.  An untruth is an untruth whether spoken by a pauper or a prince."  November 21, 1910. 
"He is one of the fussy, spluttering Denver stripplings who buss around the statehouse and think they are running something." (In reference to Anti-Saloon League activist E.E. McLaughlin.)

See also

 Congressman George Ebbert Seney (D-Ohio), Delegate to Democratic National Convention, 1876. Author of Seney's Ohio Code.
Link to George Ebbert Seney in the Political Graveyard. 
Ebbert family of Uniontown, Pennsylvania (ancestors of John Van Kirk Ebbert)

Further reading
 Ebbert, William B. On Colorado's Fair Mesas: miscellany in prose and verse, Pueblo, CO:Mail Publishing Co., 1897. Ill., 58 pp.
This book is a compilation of Ebbert's writings, including poetry, whimsical stories, social and political opinion pieces, and commentary on Pueblo, Colorado and the West.
 For information and bios on Civil War soldiers, including Ebbert, see http://www.lindapages.com 
 William B. Ebbert: Arriola Farmer-Politician, in Great Sage Plain to Timberline: Our Pioneer History, Vol. I, pp. 87–90, published by Montezuma County Historical Society, Cortez, CO: November 2009.

References

1846 births
1927 deaths
Politicians from Wheeling, West Virginia
People of West Virginia in the American Civil War
Politicians from Cincinnati
Members of the Colorado House of Representatives
Union Army officers
Montezuma County, Colorado
Pueblo County, Colorado
People from Uniontown, Pennsylvania
People from Cortez, Colorado
Writers from Wheeling, West Virginia
Military personnel from Pennsylvania
Military personnel from Colorado